Ilum can refer to:

 Ilah, as a form of the Akkadian word for "god"
 Ilum (Star Wars), a fictional planet in the Star Wars franchise

See also
Ilium (disambiguation)
Iluma